Debra Solomon is an American filmmaker, animator, illustrator, and author known best for being the animation supervisor and creator of the animated Lizzie from the Disney Channel show Lizzie McGuire (2001–2003). She has made a variety of short films, animated sketches, and title sequences since 1994. Many of her films focus on the struggles of womanhood and emphasizing the female identity with empowering images.

Biography 
Solomon's interest in film and animation began when she studied illustration at Pratt University. Once she completed her studies, Solomon became a freelance illustrator and later an animator. While drafting her first production, Mrs. Matisse (1994), Solomon continued to illustrate and produced several books.

Solomon has also curated festival programs at the ASIFA-East Animation Festival where she has demonstrated her work as well as other animation. She is a board member for the ASIFA-East, as well as a member of the British Academy of Film and Television Arts and New York Women in Film and Television.

Career 
Solomon began her career as an animator with her debut short film Mrs. Matisse (1994). The film gained attention and success from film festivals and went on to win several awards.

Everybody's Pregnant (1998) was Solomon's next film, cited by Solomon as the film that allowed her to find her artistic voice. The film was also a success, with screening at dozens of film festivals. It eventually went on to be preserved in the Museum of Modern Art's film archive.

Many of her films are animated musicals, noteworthy for their ability to turn bad situations into humorous ones. Solomon writes and performs original music for her musical productions.

Solomon contributed to the television show Lizzie McGuire (2001–2004), designing the animated counterpart of the show's title character. Solomon is credited as the creator and animation supervisor for the animated representation of Lizzie throughout the show.

After working for Disney, Solomon composed many independent films over multiple years. These films were edited together as a 30-minute special on HBO titled Getting Over Him in 8 Songs or Less (2010). Solomon's most recent film is My Kingdom (2014), a short film about personal space and finding comfort in crowded areas of a busy city.

Filmography 
Mrs. Matisse (1994)
Everybody's Pregnant (1997)
The Parable of the Clown (1998)
The Cartoon Cartoon Show (TV series) (1999)
Nikki (2000)
Private Eye Princess (2001)
Lizzie McGuire (TV series) (2001–2004)
The Lizzie McGuire Movie (2003)
Super Lambert (2004)
Get Out the Women's Vote (2004)
The Blind Men and the Elephant (2004)
Stevie Sanchez (2005)
I Wanna Know Everyone in my Building (2007)
Teach Me to be a Woman (2008)
Drugstore (2009)
Getting Over Him in Eight Songs or Less (2010)
My Kingdom (2014)

Awards and nominations

References

External links 
 
 

American animators
American filmmakers
American women film directors
American women film producers
American animated film directors
American animated film producers
American women animators
American illustrators
Living people
Pratt Institute alumni
Year of birth missing (living people)
21st-century American women